Rajendirapattinam is a village in Tamil Nadu, India.

The village
 Assembly Constituency     : Virudhachalam (152)
 Parliamentary Constituency : Cuddalore (26)
 Total Electors            : 1784 (as of January 2014)
 Total Male Electors       : 913
 Total Female Electors     : 871

The Temple

Thirukkumara Natha or Nilakantheshvara, also called Swedaaranyeshwara temple

The name of this village commemorates that in the ancient Shiva temple here a great king's prayer for a son was heard. The Chola emperor Raja Raja, who was the builder of the great temple of Tanjore, came here to pray to Shiva as Kumara Natha or Nilakantheshvara for a son. His prayer was answered and a son whom he named Rajendra was born.

It was this Rajendra who built a replica of his father's temple in Gangaikondacholapuram, some 30 kilometer south of Rajendrapattinam. Rajaraja Chola ruled from 985 to 1014. His son Rajendra Chola ruled between 1012 and 1044. Both were successful kings who brought peace and prosperity to their people.

But this temple existed long before Rajaraja was king of all of southern India. Long before his son Rajendra brought the water of the sacred river Ganga from northern India to the land of the Tamils. This is the meaning of Gangaikondacholapuram, "the city of the Chola who brought the sacred waters of Ganga". Then the place was called Thiru Erukkattam Puliyur, and it was one among five sacred places connected to the saint Vyagrapada, who is better known for his important role in the establishment of the Shiva Nataraja temple in Chidambaram, which is some 40 kilometer to the East from here. It features in the list of temples that have songs dedicated to them in the body of hymns called Thevaram, which were composed in the 6th to 7th century, and it was very ancient and sacred even then.

The sthala purana or temple myth tells of how once Parvati, the consort of Lord Shiva, did not pay proper attention when her husband was explaining the Agama or doctrine. She became distracted and Shiva became angry and cursed her. Because of the curse she was born on Earth as the daughter of a fishermen family. Her two sons, Ganesha (the god who is the destroyer of obstacles and has the face of an elephant) and Subrahmanya (the young war god who rides the peacock) thereupon threw away the Agama. His father, Shiva, cursed him to become a dumb boy. He searched for relief of the curse and finally came to Erukkattam Puliyur. Here he prayed and worshiped Siva, and performed penance. He also thrashed his vel or spear into the ground and created the sacred pond in front of the temple, now called Nilurpala thirtham. Shiva was now pleased with his penance and released him from the curse. That is why Shiva here is called Thirukumara Nathar. Thiru (Shri, the shining one), Kumara (the young boy, Subrahmaya or Murugan), Natha (Lord, who is worshipped by).

The sthala vriksham or sacred tree of this temple is the velerukku tree.

The main shrine for Shiva and the shrine for the goddess have T podikai and the outer walls of the garbhagriha each has a panjara instead of a niche. The T podikai suggests a construction date belonging to the time of Rajaraja Chola, till around the time of the ascention of Kulottung I. The Panjaras are of the II b type (G.Hoekveld-Meijer, Koyils in the Colamandalam, 1981, p. 115). They do not have a base of their own, and the shala which forms the top is not part of the kapota. It is very well possible this shrine may have been built by Rajaraja or his son, Rajendra. The murtis in the panjara do not seem to belong to these panjara, or to the Chola period. They are done in an archaic style and are  smaller than the panjaras. They may have been preserved from the earlier temple structure when this temple was rebuilt under the Cholas.

References

Villages in Cuddalore district